Bimax may refer to:
Airfer Bimax, a Spanish paramotor design
Houde Bimax, a French ultralight aircraft design